Eberstadt is a municipality in the district of Heilbronn, Baden-Württemberg, Germany. It is best known for its winegrowing and its yearly international high jump meeting (the Internationales Hochsprung-Meeting Eberstadt).

References

External links
 Website of the high jump meeting in German 

Heilbronn (district)